Eudonia religiosa is a moth of the family Crambidae. It is endemic to the Hawaiian islands of Oahu and possibly Hawaii.

External links

Moths described in 1904
Eudonia
Endemic moths of Hawaii